The 1909 Tie Cup Final was the final match to decide the winner of the Tie Cup, the 10th. edition of the international competition organised by the Argentine and Uruguayan Associations together. The final was contested by Argentine Alumni and Uruguayan CURCC. 

In the match, played at Estadio G.E.B.A. in Belgrano, Alumni beat CURCC 4–0, with goals by Eliseo Brown (3) and Alfredo Brown, achieving not only its sixth Tie Cup trophy but the record of titles won by any team. It was also the last international title won by the team before Alumni was officially dissolved in April 1913.

Qualified teams

Overview 

Alumni qualified for the final after having won the Copa de Competencia Jockey Club, where the squad beat Rosarian teams Provincial (4–0) and Rosario Central (3–1 in Colegiales), San Isidro (3–2) and Newell's Old Boys in the final (5–1). The match was held in Gimnasia y Esgrima Stadium in Palermo on 5 September 1905. There was a low attendance due to bad weather.

The rain fallen during almost all the morning prior to the match left the field so muddy that players had problems to control the ball. Even though, Eliseo Brown received the ball 40 meters from the rival goal and started his run. When he was 25 meters from the goal Brown shot for the first goal of Alumni. On 40 minutes, Weiss passed to Arnold Watson Hutton who shot to the goal. Goalkeeper Pintos stopped the shot but the ball rebounded on his hands so Alfredo Brown took advantage of the play to score the second goal. Three minutes later, another pass from Weiss was connected by Eliseo Brown who scored the third goal.

The fourth goal came in the second half, with few minutes left when Eliseo Brown scored the last one for the final 4–0 of Alumni over CURCC. He was also the topscorer of the match with three goals. This edition of the Tie Cup was the last international title won by Alumni. In 1911 the club ceased its participation in official football competitions and two year later it was definitively dissolved.

Match details

References

1909 in Argentine football
1909 in Uruguayan football
T
T
Football in Buenos Aires